Mount Allan is the name of several places and things worldwide:

Places
In Antarctica
Mount Allan (Antarctica)

In Australia
Mount Allan (Station), Northern Territory, a former pastoral lease on which Yuelamu is located (also spelt Allen)

In Canada
Mount Allan (Canada), a mountain which is the site of the Nakiska ski resort

See also
Mount Allen (disambiguation)